Domino is a 1943 French drama film directed by Roger Richebé and starring Fernand Gravey, Simone Renant and Aimé Clariond. It is based on the 1932 play of the same title by Marcel Achard. It was shot at the Saint-Maurice Studios in Paris. The film's sets were designed by the art director Lucien Carré.

Synopsis
A young man known as Domino arrives back in Paris virtually penniless. To try and raise money he tries to sell a statuette to an art dealer, but is soon drawn into a deception by the gallery owner's wife who is trying to convince her jealous husband that love letters he has discovered from her ongoing affair are really relics of her long ago romance with Domino.

Cast
 Fernand Gravey as 	Dominique
 Simone Renant as Laurette
 Aimé Clariond as Heller 
 Yves Deniaud as 	Mirandole
 Suzet Maïs as	Jane
 Bernard Blier as 	Crémone
 Léonce Corne as 	L'hôtelier 
 Paul Faivre as Le voyageur 
 Jean Marconi as 	Le passant

References

Bibliography
 Goble, Alan. The Complete Index to Literary Sources in Film. Walter de Gruyter, 1999.

External links 
 

1943 films
French drama films
1940s French-language films
1943 drama films
Films directed by Roger Richebé
French films based on plays
Films shot at Saint-Maurice Studios
Films set in Paris
1940s French films